The Adventures of Teddy Ruxpin is a children's animated television series based on Teddy Ruxpin, an animatronic teddy bear created by Ken Forsse and distributed by toy manufacturer Worlds of Wonder. Produced in 1986–7 for television syndication by DIC Enterprises with Atkinson Film-Arts, the series employed many of the same voice actors used in the book-and-tape series that was made for the eponymous animatronic toy. While some of the stories used in the TV series were adapted from the books, many were original and greatly expanded upon the world established there. The series differed from traditional children's animation in that most of its 65 episodes were serialized rather than in traditional episodic form.

In the United States, the series was originally syndicated by LBS Communications. Today, all international distribution rights to the series were previously held by Don Taffner's DLT Entertainment. The series is currently owned by The Jim Henson Company under its HIP (Henson Independent Properties) subsidary.

Plot
The Adventures of Teddy Ruxpin follows 15-year-old Teddy Ruxpin as he leaves his home on the island of Rillonia with his best friend Grubby to follow an ancient map which leads him to find a collection of crystals on the mainland of Grundo. With the help of his new friend Dr. Newton Gimmick, Teddy and Grubby discover the magical powers of what turns out to be an ancestral treasure as well as an organization with ambitions to use it for evil known as M.A.V.O. (short for Monsters and Villains Organization). Along the way, Teddy learns the long-lost history of his species and clues to the location of his missing father.

Series history
In mid-1986, Atkinson Film-Arts of Ottawa, Ontario, Canada was commissioned to co-produce (with Worlds of Wonder, Alchemy II, and DiC) a 65 episode animated television series based on the World of Teddy Ruxpin characters. The series followed a prior attempt to produce a live-action series which had proved too difficult and expensive. Atkinson was in charge of the principal animation and casting. Of the previous voice actors associated with the Teddy Ruxpin property, only Phil Baron (Teddy) and Will Ryan (Grubby) traveled to Canada to remain part of the cast; most other characters were re-cast with local Canadian voice talent. The series was originally intended to continue after the first series of episodes, but because of economic problems at Worlds of Wonder (the series' primary financial partner), a second set of episodes was not produced while Worlds of Wonder still had rights to the property. Interest remains among the owners of the Teddy Ruxpin property and the fanbase to continue the story originated in the animated series, which ended its 65-episode run in somewhat of a cliffhanger.

Characters

Main characters
The three main protagonists, often referred to collectively in fandom as The Trio:

 Teddy Ruxpin (voiced by Phil Baron) - The protagonist of the series. He is a teenage Illiop (roughly 15) whose father disappeared when he was a child. He comes to Grundo to follow a treasure map. Like other Illiops, he is kind and friendly. He loves adventure, meeting new faces, and having new experiences.
 Grubby (voiced by Will Ryan) - Teddy's best friend who is an Octopede about Teddy's age. Noted for his large appetite, he is fond of cooking and eating root stew and other foods made from roots (which usually do not taste good to non-Octopedes). Though not the bravest or smartest of Teddy's friends, he always sticks by Teddy.
 Newton Gimmick (voiced by John Stocker) - A balding Perloon inventor with a severe stuttering problem and a broad and otherwise questionable definition of "science". Most of his "inventions" either do not work or don't serve any real purpose. Newton is also somewhat absent-minded. He is usually referred to simply as Gimmick.

Allies
 Prince Arin (voiced by Robert Bockstael) - The brave Illiper son of the king and queen of Grundo. He lives at Grundo Castle and speaks with a British-sounding accent. He first met the heroic trio while searching for his kidnapped sister.
 Princess Aruzia (voiced by Abby Hagyard) - Prince Arin's younger sister who has a sweet demeanor. Though a princess, she does not mind doing work. Wooly apparently has a crush on her.
 The Wooly Whatsit (voiced by Pier Kohl) - A large furry purple creature who is not very bright, but very helpful and good-hearted. Later revealed to be a Snowzo, a legendary yeti-like species. He is usually referred to simply as Wooly.
 Leota (voiced by Holly Larocque) - A strict but kind Woodsprite and teacher. Most of her students are elves and woodsprites, but Wooly joined the class as well.
 Louie (voiced by Will Ryan) - A Grunge filmographer.
 Burl Ruxpin (voiced by Phil Baron) - Teddy's long-lost father. An Illiop who lost his memory a long time ago and lived as a hermit, but regained his identity toward the end of the series.

Villains
 M.A.V.O. - Short for Monsters and Villains Organization, it is an organization that terrorizes the land of Grundo.
 Quellor (voiced by Les Lye) - The Supreme Oppressor of M.A.V.O. and the main antagonist of the series. Quellor is an unspecified creature dressed in dark heavy robes who sees the Illiops as an enemy to his master plan of regaining all six crystals to the one he has in The Black Box. With them, his darkness will reign supremely over the land of Grundo.
 Sludge - An unspecified blue creature with red hair who is one of Quellor's henchmonsters and a monster in M.A.V.O.
 Trudge - An unspecified green-gray creature with black spots who is one of Quellor's henchmonsters and a monster in M.A.V.O.
 Drudge - An unspecified yellow, orange, and blue creature who is one of Quellor's henchmonsters and a monster in M.A.V.O.
 Dweezil - Quellor's pet rat/bat creature that is often used by Quellor to send secret messages.
 Ickley Bognostroclum (voiced by Pier Kohl) - A Troll who is the gatekeeper of M.A.V.O. Ickley has the encyclopedic knowledge of all of M.A.V.O.'s rules and laws. He is also a good friend of Eleanor Tweeg.
 Mrs. Maggotheart - An unspecified creature who is the dues collector of M.A.V.O. and makes sure its members pay their dues.
 Understander of Legends (voiced by John Stocker) - An unspecified creature and a member of M.A.V.O. who serves as the interpreter of the ancient runes.
 Jack W. Tweeg (voiced by John Koensgen) - A Troll/Grunge hybrid and an evil wizard-wannabe who thinks he has a recipe to turn buttermilk into gold, is very suspicious, and often spies on Gimmick from his tower. Usually referred to as simply Tweeg, he has desperately wanted to join M.A.V.O. where his plans have often been ridiculed by Quellor.
 L.B. (voiced by Robert Bockstael) - Short for Lead Bounder, L.B. is a sarcastic Bounder who usually acts as Tweeg's henchman. L.B. does not show a particularly high degree of loyalty or intelligence, but has enough sense to know that Tweeg's schemes never work. L.B. constantly calls Tweeg by variations of his name, such as "Twix" or "Twizzle", much to Tweeg's annoyance. 
 Eleanor Tweeg (voiced by Abby Hagyard) - A Troll who is the mother of Jack W. Tweeg. She supports his campaign and is good friends with Ickley Bognostroclum.

Species
The Adventures of Teddy Ruxpin features a large menagerie of sentient species for its character base:

 Illiops: Humanoid bear-like creatures, with kind dispositions. Reside in modern Rillonia after a forced mass exodus from ancient Grundo, where they had an advanced civilization.
 Octopedes: Yellow and caterpillar-like creatures with eight legs & orange spots, each with fully-formed hands. The first pair are employed as hands, while the rest are used for walking. Are often culturally nocturnal, but have no trouble with a diurnal lifestyle.
 Perloons: Humans who usually are professional in nature (e.g. scientist, doctor, wizard).
 Illipers: The near-relatives to humans but broad-faced with flat noses, who live in a medieval-type society with a royal monarchy. In ancient times, they shared a close association with the civilization of the Illiops.
 Grunges: Relatives of the Illipers but jungle-dwellers with antennae in lieu of ears, who tend to be passionate about their hobbies. There are two distinct cultures: the tough and hardy jungle Grunges, and the laid-back, fun-loving, hippie-like surf Grunges.
 Fobs: Small, furry, limbless, multicolored and penguin-like creatures, sometimes kept as sapient pets.
 Elves: Tiny humanoids with pointy ears and shoes. Share a common culture with the Woodsprites.
 Woodsprites: Tiny humanoids with butterfly-like wings. Share a common culture with the Elves.
 Snowzos: A race of large, white and yeti-like creatures who look more dangerous than they are. Prefer very cold temperatures.
 Bounders: A race of red, round, two-legged creatures with a rhinoceros-like horn on top of their heads, usually sarcastic. They are said by some viewers to resemble Ripto from the Spyro the Dragon series.
 Mudblups: A race of large and lumpy animated blobs of mud, dull-witted and slow-moving but very strong. Sensitive to bright light, since all of their lives are spent underground.
 Trolls: Green & thin creatures with pointed noses. For them, being good means being bad.
 Gutangs: Green and monkey-like creatures who wear brown tribal owl-like armor, usually belligerent. Known for attacking in their fixed-wing flying machines. 
 Anythings: Small shy creatures able to change into other objects, e.g., carrots, potatoes, other produce. They use their ability to hide. They were previously called Nothings.

The Seven Crystals of Grundo
 The First Crystal (Imagination) – Shrink and Grow
 The Second Crystal (Honesty) – Duplication
 The Third Crystal (Bravery) – Invisibility
 The Fourth Crystal (Trust) – Oxygen Generator
 The Fifth Crystal (Friendship) – Speed Altering
 The Sixth Crystal (Freedom) – Flight Ability
 The Seventh Crystal (The Black Box) – Restore and Erase Memory

The episodes

Overview
Although the series is mostly serialized, it is further broken down into weekly story arcs which involve visiting a different part of Grundo or exploring a major plot thread, often ending in cliffhangers. Some story lines were taken directly from the toy's book & tape story sets, with secondary plots added to increase the running time.

Protect Yourself
Due to the partnership between Worlds of Wonder and the National Center for Missing & Exploited Children, when the series was originally syndicated, each episode included a short segment called "Protect Yourself" which ran after a teaser for the next episode and prior to the credits. It featured an animated Teddy Ruxpin on a live-action set, who would introduce contemporary child stars such as Jason Bateman, Brice Beckham, Tiffany Brissette, Shannen Doherty, Corey Feldman. and Shalane McCall. The guest would then give young viewers advice on topics such as avoiding strangers, what to do in an emergency, how to respond to inappropriate touching, or running away. A common theme was to talk to a trusted grown up for help.

Season 1 (1986–87)

Season 2 (1987)

Cast
 Phil Baron – Teddy Ruxpin, Burl Ruxpin
 Will Ryan – Grubby, Louie
 John Stocker – Newton Gimmick, Understander of Legends
 John Koensgen – Jack W. Tweeg, the Wizard of Weegee
 Robert Bockstael – L.B., Prince Arin
 Abby Hagyard – Princess Aruzia, Eleanor Tweeg, Eunice
 Pier Kohl – The Wooly Whatsit, Ickley Bognostroclum, Additional Voices
 Holly Larocque – Leota the Woodsprite
 Les Lye – Quellor, Additional Voices
 Heather Esdon – Additional Voices
 Donna Farron – Additional Voices
 Rick Jones – Additional Voices
 Anna MacCormack – Additional Voices
 Doug Stratton – Additional Voices
 Terrence Scammell – Digger, Additional Voices

NOTE: In the tape & book series and the animatronic pilot episode, Tony Pope voiced Gimmick, Will Ryan also voiced Tweeg, Prince Arin, and Wooly, Katie Leigh voiced Princess Aruzia, and Russi Taylor voiced Leota.

VHS/DVD releases
Between 1987 and 1988, Hi-Tops Video released twelve volumes of the series (17 episodes) on VHS. They featured between 1 and 3 episodes per tape, and often had a live-action Teddy Ruxpin as a host.

In February 2006, First National Pictures released two volumes of the series (11 episodes) on DVD. Two additional volumes were to be released to complete the series but for unknown reasons they were never released.

In January 2008, Mill Creek Entertainment acquired the rights to the series; they subsequently released all 65 episodes in three volume sets. Later in January 2009, Mill Creek Entertainment released a 6-disc complete series box set featuring all 65 episodes on DVD for the first time. As of 2010, these releases have been discontinued and are out of print.

As of 2012, Image Entertainment have acquired the rights to the series. On July 10, 2012, they released a 10-disc set featuring all 65 episodes of the series entitled The Complete Adventures of Teddy Ruxpin on DVD in Region 1.

Original concept
Originally, Alchemy II Inc. had hoped to create a live-action series using animatronic characters, as Ken Forsse had helped Disney do with Welcome to Pooh Corner and Dumbo's Circus. Due to production costs and difficulties in this format, Forsse, AlchemyII and Worlds of Wonder decided animation would be a better route and the 65 episode animated series was created. The pilot episode of what would have been the animatronic series was instead broadcast as an ABC Weekend Special in two parts airing from November 30 to December 7, 1985, and also aired in syndication as a 2-part episode. The show can be found on videocassette. The "animatronic movie", as it's called by Teddy Ruxpin fans, used primarily the same voice talent as the Teddy Ruxpin toy software had, most of which (with the exception of Phil Baron and Will Ryan) were replaced in the later animated TV series by Canadian voice talent.

Impact in popular culture
The Adventures of Teddy Ruxpin (Мечето Ръкспин), was one of the first Western cartoon shows to be seen by the population of Bulgaria in the late 1980s. The influence of this show can be seen in the text of the contemporary post-punk band REVIEW (РЕВЮ) and their song "Teddy Ruxpin" ; also, the first underground music shop to open in the nation's capital of Sofia, was and is to this date called MAVO (ОЧЗ), in reference to the antagonists in the cartoon show.

Brigsby Bear, a 2017 American film, featured an animatronic bear suit, similar to the one in the animatronic pilot for the Adventures of Teddy Ruxpin. In the plot of the film, the suit is used in the production of a children's television series, which features magical crystals and creatures, just as The Adventures of Teddy Ruxpin cartoon did.

References

External links
 Teddy Ruxpin Online- A Fan Website with an interview with creator Ken Forsse
 Illiop.com
 
 The UNofficial Teddy Ruxpin Frequently Asked Questions website – The oldest Teddy Ruxpin fan website

1980s American daily animated television series
1980s Canadian animated television series
1986 American television series debuts
1986 Canadian television series debuts
1987 American television series endings
1987 Canadian television series endings
ABC Weekend Special
American children's animated adventure television series
American children's animated comedy television series
American children's animated fantasy television series
American television shows based on children's books
Animated television series about bears
Canadian children's animated adventure television series
Canadian children's animated comedy television series
Canadian children's animated fantasy television series
Canadian television shows based on children's books
English-language television shows
Fictional anthropomorphic characters
First-run syndicated television programs in the United States
Teletoon original programming
Television series by DIC Entertainment
Television series by Fremantle (company)
Television shows based on toys
YTV (Canadian TV channel) original programming